Stob Coire a' Chearcaill (771 m) is a mountain in the Northwest Highlands, Scotland. It lies west of Loch Linnhe in Lochaber.

The peak is a familiar sight from Fort William, from where it can be seen across the Loch. The easiest route to the summit is from the small settlement of Blaich, and the views are excellent from the top.

References

Mountains and hills of the Northwest Highlands
Marilyns of Scotland
Corbetts